The Association of West African Merchants was a trade association who sold European goods in Gold Coast. It was originally formed in 1916 for European merchants to discuss problems relating to West African trade. The Gold coast branch was formed  during the late war suggested by the government to assist the administration of the war-time economic controls. AWAM is an acronym for manipulating terms of trade to disadvantaged customers in favor of traders. In the local parlance it was synonymous to "Kuluulu" .

History 
Members of the Association of West African Merchants was made up of the United Africa Company, Union Trading Company), and "Oliphant" (G. B. Olivant). The firms participated in merchandise agreements in Gold Coast. Their participation led to limited competition between in the retail sector by determining the minimum prices and commissions.

There were agitations from the indigenes against foreign imports. The Association of West African Merchants was accused of conspiring with the colonial government cutting Africans out of wholesaling and retailing, trade monopoly, cheating customers. They were also involved in price-fixing and market-sharing agreements restricting import-export trade in Gold Coast.

The operationalization of the Association of West African Merchants led to the boycott of European imports by Mr. Theodore Taylor also known as Nii Kwabena Bonney III, an Accra businessman and chief and Osu Alata Mantse with the slogan: "We cannot buy; Your prices are too high. If you don’t cut down your prices then close down your stores; And take away your goods to your own country," The boycott coincided with the peaceful match to Osu castle by World war veterans demanding equal pension pay as that of their British counterparts.

This event led to the Riots of 1948 as three of the protesters, namely Sergeant Adjetey, Lance Corporal Attipoe and Private Odartey-Lamptey were shot dead on the 28th February 1948. In all 29 people were shot dead and 237 were injured, leading to the looting of Association of West African Merchants shops.

This event led to the declaration of martial law and the arrest of the Big six. This was followed by the Watson commission that led to the delivery of constitution for independence. The Watson Commission  recommended an extensive Legislative Assembly with more Ghanaian inclusive.

Significance 

 From these events emerged the Henley Coussey commission that was led by an African lawyer. The commissions recommendations included a new constitution with democratic procedures and a greater representation of Africans as the basis of future colonial approach.
 In 1949, Sir Charles Arden-Clarke was appointed governor of the territory.
 Dismissive of Coussey's reforms as "bogus and fraudulent" by Dr.Kwame Nkrumah leading to the split of the UGCC to form CPP.
 The road to the seat of Government was renamed the 28 February Road which is now called the Prof.John Fiifi Atta Mills High Street.
 The Gold Coast Industrial Development Corporation (GCIDC) was established by the colonial administration in 1952 to provide support to indigenes;to establish an entity that would facilitate participation of private indigenous persons in business.
 There were social, cultural, and political implications of consumerism that led up to and directly after Gold Coast independence in 1957.

References 

1916 in Africa
History of Ghana
Ghana–United Kingdom relations